Step Across the Border is a soundtrack double album by English guitarist, composer and improvisor Fred Frith, of the 1990 avant-garde documentary film on Frith, Step Across the Border. The album features music from the film performed by Frith and other musicians, and covers ten years of Frith's musical career from 1979 to 1989.

Music
Step Across the Border is more than a just a soundtrack. It includes additional tracks, for example, "Drum Factory" and "Candy Machine", that were written for the album by Frith from ambient sounds in the film. Discussing the album, Frith said:

The album also includes live music as performed in the film, for example "Houston St"; tracks from other albums that accompany scenes in the film, for example "Too Much Too Little"; and tracks from other albums that replace live covers of those tracks performed in the film, for example "Legs".

Reception

In a review for AllMusic, Rick Anderson described Step Across the Border as an "excellent overview" of Frith's work. He said the music on the album ranges from "tuneful and charming to stark and forbidding", and was particularly pleased with the material from Massacre's (then out-of-print) first album. Anderson rated Step Across the Border "highly recommended".

Reviewing the album in Leonardo, Stefaan Van Ryssen noted that Step Across the Border is more than a soundtrack: Frith "creates a narrative structure that parallels and complements the [film]". Van Ryssen said this narrative structure is the album's strength, but also its weakness. He described the tracks as "nice but anecdotal patches" that "lack scope and meaning in [themselves]" until they are "stitched together by an invisible ... thread" to build a story. But the listener is not given the means to easily recreate the story, which Van Ryssen felt, may make it difficult to fully appreciate the music.

Track listing
All tracks composed by Fred Frith except where stated.

Personnel
The numbers below indicate the tracks on which the musicians played.
Fred Frith (1–3, 5–22, 24–26) – guitar, violin, bass guitar, DX7, Casio, percussion, bottles, home-made instruments, voice
Tom Cora (1, 7, 10) – cello, drum, voice
Zeena Parkins (1, 10) – keyboards, drum, voice
Bob Ostertag (2a, 11, 24) – Serge synthesizer, tapes, samples
Bill Laswell (2b, 17a) – bass guitar
Fred Maher (2b, 17a) – drums
Haco (4) – piano, voice
John Zorn (5) – alto saxophone
Jean Derome (11) – alto saxophone
René Lussier (11) – bass guitar
Kevin Norton (11) – drums
Eino Haapala (13) – guitar
Lars Hollmer (13) – keyboards
Hans Bruniusson (13, 21) – drums
Tim Hodgkinson (14) – bass clarinet
Iva Bittová (19, 23) – violin, voice
Pavel Fajt (19, 23) – beer cans, guitar, voice
Eitetsu Hayashi (20) – taiko
Tina Curran (25) – bass guitar

Recording details
Tracks 1, 10 – recorded by Tim Hodgkinson at Sunrise, Kirchberg, Switzerland, December 1985
Tracks 2a, 24 – recorded live at PASS, New York City, January 1981
Track 2b – recorded by Martin Bisi at OAO Studio, New York, June 1981
Tracks 3a, 4 – recorded by Yasushi Utsunomiyaat at MUE Studio, Osaka, Japan, February 1988
Tracks 2a, 3b, 6, 8, 12, 15, 16, 17b, 18, 22, 24, 26 – recorded by Rainer Carben at Bavaria TV Studios in Munich, Germany, December 1989
Tracks 5, 7 – recorded live at The Kitchen, New York City, February 1989
Tracks 9, 12 – recorded live at the Romanisches Café, Tokyo, Japan, February 1988
Track 11 – recorded live in rehearsal at Roulette, New York City, February 1988
Track 13 – recorded at Chickenhouse, Uppsala, Sweden and Sunrise, Kirchberg, Switzerland, July 1979
Tracks 14, 20, 22 – recorded live at ROX, Tokyo, Japan, February 1988
Track 14 – recorded at Hodgkinson's home in Yorkshire and Brixton, England, December 1988
Tracks 17a, 21, 25 – recorded in Frith's apartment in New York City, August 1983
Track 19 – recorded by Rudolf Oleschko in Provence, France and Paosostraße, Munich, Germany, July 1989
Tracks 23 – recorded at a hotel room, Bern, Switzerland March 1989

Tracks from other albums
Track 1 – from Skeleton Crew's contribution to the Island of Sanity compilation (1986)
Tracks 2a, 24 – from Fred Frith, Bob Ostertag and Phil Minton's LP Voice of America (1982)
Track 2b – from Massacre's LP Killing Time (1981)
Track 10 – from Skeleton Crew's LP The Country of Blinds (1986)
Track 13 – from Fred Frith's LP Gravity (1980)
Tracks 17a, 21, 25 – from Fred Frith's LP Cheap at Half the Price (1983)

CD reissues
In 1991 East Side Digital Records and RecRec Music re-issued Step Across the Border on CD.
In 2003 Fred Records released a remastered version of Step Across the Border on CD.

See also
Cut Up the Border

References

External links
Improvised Music from Japan Step across the Border

Albums produced by Fred Frith
Fred Frith soundtracks
1990 soundtrack albums
Fred Records soundtracks
RecRec Music soundtracks
Documentary film soundtracks